Panzerwaffe, later also Panzertruppe (German for "Armoured Force", "Armoured Arm" or "Tank Force". Waffe:  [combat] "arm") refers to a command within the Heer of the German Wehrmacht, responsible for the affairs of panzer (tank) and motorized forces shortly before and during the Second World War.

History
It was originally known as Schnelltruppen ("Fast Troops"); a motorized command established in the Reichswehr following the First World War, redesignated as Panzerwaffe in 1936 by Generalleutnant Heinz Guderian.

Panzertruppen
The men of the Panzerwaffe, are referred to as Panzertruppen (Armoured Troops), were distinguishable by their close fitting black uniforms, known as Panzer wraps. The corps colour of the German Panzertruppe was pink.

In addition to practical considerations, the uniform was inspired by the traditional uniform of the Brunswick Hussars. After 1943, the Panzerwaffe, like most other German branches of service, had relaxed the uniform rules and many Panzertruppen wore a variety of clothing, including camouflage and winter items.

Two training schools existed for panzer crews throughout the war, Panzertruppenschule I and II.

The mainstay of the Panzerwaffe was the Panzer division. These consisted of a panzer brigade (two tank regiments) and two motorized or mechanized infantry regiments. All forces of a Panzer division were mobile. Support elements included self-propelled artillery, self-propelled anti-tank, and armored reconnaissance cars. After the campaigns in Poland and France, the Panzer divisions were reduced in size, with only one Panzerregiment per Division. This move was taken to allow the creation of several new divisions with the available tanks.

Panzergrenadier
Motorized infantry were an early formation, and consisted of infantry transported by trucks. Early in the war, there were a number of light divisions, each a semi-motorized cavalry force created out of compromise with the Heer's cavalry command. These were judged inadequate following the Invasion of Poland and converted to fully motorized units.

During World War II they converted again to armoured reconnaissance divisions by the name of Panzergrenadier divisions consisting of motorized infantry (or armored infantry for some of the battalions, when sufficient (18 vehicles) half-tracked armored carriers were available), with self-propelled artillery( three battalions, each one with 14 self-propelled guns) and Jagdpanzer, and in some cases a significant panzer component.

Organization
A panzer corps consisted of two to three divisions and auxiliary attachments. Panzergruppen ("Panzer Groups") were commands larger than a corps, approximately the size of an army, and named after their commander (e.g. Panzergruppe Hoth). These were later recognized as Panzerarmeen ("Panzer Armies"), an army-level command of two to three corps. These higher-level organizations almost always mixed ordinary infantry units with the Panzerwaffe.

Significant numbers of panzer and motorized formations were of the Waffen-SS. These did not fall under the Panzerwaffe administratively, although operationally they were organized and fought as part of army formations and under army command.

See also
 Panzer, Tank, German AFVs of World War II
 Panzer brigade, Panzerkorps, Panzer division, List of German divisions in World War II
 Panzer uniform
 Blitzkrieg, Armoured warfare, Maneuver warfare
 Wehrmacht, Heer, Luftwaffe, Waffen-SS
 General der Panzertruppe
 Panzerlied

References 

 

Armoured units and formations of Germany
Military administrative corps of Germany